The 2008–09 Indonesia Super League U-21 Final was a football match which was played on 20 May 2009. It was the 1st final of the Indonesia Super League U-21. The match was played at the Jalak Harupat Stadium in Soreang, Bandung Regency and was contested by Persita U-21 of Tangerang and Pelita Jaya U-21 from Karawang. Pelita U-21 and Persita U-21 was a debutant of the final stage.

Match details

See also
2008–09 Indonesia Super League U-21

References

External links
Indonesia Super League standings (including U-21 ISL)

Final